Sarah Oh  (born 1990 in Glendale, Arizona) is an American actress and model. She is of Korean-German descent.

Biography
She began acting when she was 13 at her school's theater department and starred in every single main stage production thereafter. Oh's first acting performance was in a one-act show based on the book Go Ask Alice where she played Alice. She later moved to Los Angeles at the age of 18 to further pursue her acting and modeling career.

Career
Oh was cast in her first big feature in 2011 called Altergeist where she played a paranormal investigator. She later made more appearances in TV shows such as "The Bold and the Beautiful", "Rizzoli and Isles", "Knotts" and "House of Lies" along with features such as "Dirty Teacher", "Capture" (not yet released), "Altergeist". She aspires to make her way into the industry in Korea as well.  On Splash and Bubbles she voices a number of recurring characters.

Personal life
Oh enjoys dancing and singing on her free time. She speaks fluent Korean.

Filmography

References

External links

 
 

American people of German descent
American actresses of Korean descent
American actresses
Living people
1990 births
21st-century American women